Bobby Hughes may refer to:

 Bobby Hughes (baseball) (born 1971), former Major League Baseball catcher
 Bobby Hughes (footballer) (1892–1955), English football outside forward

See also
 Robert Hughes (disambiguation)
 Bob Hughes, a fictional character on the American soap opera As the World Turns